Zachary Ben Hample (born September 14, 1977) is an American baseball collector and writer. Hample claims to have collected more than 12,000 baseballs from Major League stadiums, including Alex Rodriguez's 3,000th career hit and Mike Trout's first career home run.

Hample has been criticized by sportswriters, players, and fans, due to his alleged aggressive tactics to collect baseballs.

Early life 
Hample was raised in New York City. He is the son of author, performer, playwright and cartoonist Stoo Hample. He developed an interest in baseball at the age of five. He hoped to play Major League Baseball and later began collecting baseball memorabilia.

Baseball collection history

The first baseball that Hample caught at a game was at Shea Stadium in 1990. Hample has described his interest in catching foul balls as "a passion." He has said his obsession for catching balls developed "when I got my first ball, it’s like it multiplied from there. I wanted it so bad, not just one, I wanted another, and another and another."

Hample caught his 6,000th baseball in 2012. As of 2022, he claimed to have caught 12,000 balls. He developed a device for catching balls at stadiums made out of a baseball glove, rubber band and pen.

Hample claims to have developed a number of relationships with current and former professional baseball players including Richard Bleier, Heath Bell, and Jeremy Guthrie.

Hample's baseball collecting has been controversial inside and outside the game of baseball. Hample's aggressive tactics have resulted in widespread criticism from sportswriters. According to Hample, Clayton Kershaw once refused to give him a ball, saying that he already had "7,000 of 'em."

A documentary about Hample was released in 2022.

Notable events
In 2008, Hample caught the last Mets homerun hit at Shea Stadium. On April 18, 2013, Hample caught two home run balls during a game at Yankee Stadium, including the first career homer of shortstop Didi Gregorius. He also caught the first career home runs of Mike Trout and Mike Nickeas, and Barry Bonds' 724th home run.
In June 2015, Hample caught Alex Rodriguez's 3,000th career hit, which was a home run. Hample initially refused to return the ball. However, he eventually agreed to give the ball to Rodriguez as part of an agreement with the Yankees where the organization donated $150,000 to Pitch In For Baseball. Hample also personally received an autographed jersey, two autographed bats, a VIP backstage tour of the stadium and tickets to the 2015 MLB All-Star Game and Home Run Derby as part of his deal.

Hample acquired a ticket to the Fort Bragg Game on July 3, 2016, at Fort Bragg Stadium, that was meant for active duty military personnel and their friends and families. Hample announced on Twitter that he was attending the game, and would donate $100 for every ball he collected to a charity for military veterans. He came under widespread criticism for taking the ticket, and because he had publicly offered $1,000 to buy a ticket. Hample claimed to have caught 11 balls at the game, and gave ten of them away. He also made a $1,100 donation to AMVETS. Hample later posted an apology on Twitter.

In August 2022, Hample attempted to enter a prohibited section at Coors Field, which required a specific ticket for entry, to catch a Nolan Arenado home run ball. After Hample refused to comply, a group of security guards told him he must remain seated or he would be ejected from the game. Hample agreed, but complained about the "fan experience." According to a Twitter post, a Rockies usher also claimed Hample had grabbed a ball dropped by a young fan and refused to return it when asked. In response to the incident, Chicago Cubs pitcher Marcus Stroman criticized Hample, calling him "a loser." The Portland Pickles, a collegiate summer baseball team, announced that they had banned Hample from attending games at Walker Stadium following the incident. Hample later removed a video about the incident from his channel and posted an apology.

Writing 
Hample has written several books about baseball. His first book, How to Snag Major League Baseballs (1999), is about ballhawking.

His second book Watching Baseball Smarter (2007) is an introduction to the mechanics and rules of baseball, and was mostly well received by critics. Craig Smith of The Seattle Times wrote that it "isn’t the first book to take on the challenge of explaining baseball intricacies, but I’ve never seen it done better." Publishers Weekly called it "an invaluable resource for armchair fans."

In 2011, Hample published his third book, The Baseball: Stunts, Scandals, and Secrets Beneath the Stitches, which chronicles the history of baseballs. Mike Shannon, editor-in-chief of Spitball magazine, described The Baseball as the "new authority on the subject." Kirkus Reviews gave a positive review, writing that it "provides plenty of revelations to even the most passionate follower of the game." Blogcritics described the book as entertaining and accessible to both baseball fans and readers unfamiliar with the sport.

Other activities

Helicopter stunts
On July 2, 2012, Hample attempted to catch a baseball dropped from a helicopter 1,000 feet above LeLacheur Park in Lowell, Massachusetts. Wearing catcher's gear that was donated by Rawlings, Hample caught a softball dropped from a height of 312 feet. He then caught baseballs dropped from heights of 562 feet and 822 feet before the Federal Aviation Administration called off the stunt due to strong winds. The 822-foot catch was initially thought to be 762 feet, but a discrepancy in the altimeter settings, which was captured on video and discovered months later, added 60 feet to the altitude. On July 13, 2013, Hample made another attempt at LeLacheur Park and succeeded in catching a baseball dropped from an altitude of 1,050 feet.

The catch is not recognized as a record by Guinness World Records, as no one from the organization was in attendance to verify the attempt.

Video games
Hample, a competitive video game player, appeared briefly in the 2007 documentary The King of Kong: A Fistful of Quarters. According to Twin Galaxies, he holds official world records on half a dozen classic video games including Breakout (896 points) and Arkanoid (1,658,110 points).

Fundraising
According to Pitch in for Baseball and Softball, a non-profit charity that provides baseball and softball equipment to underprivileged children, Hample has raised "tens of thousands" of dollars for the organization. He raises the money with help from fans, who pledge money for every baseball that he snags at Major League stadiums, and from BIGS Sunflower Seeds, who sponsored him during the 2013 season.

Personal life
Hample lives on the Upper West Side of Manhattan. Hample is Jewish and his brother, Joe, is a rabbi.

Hample's family owns and operates Argosy Book Store, and was the focus of the 2019 documentary The Booksellers.

References

External links
 Official blog
 Official website

1977 births
21st-century American non-fiction writers
American bloggers
American booksellers
American sportswriters
Baseball spectators
Baseball writers
American collectors
Guilford College alumni
Living people
Writers from New York City
American Jews
Columbia Grammar & Preparatory School alumni
Baseball memorabilia